The C. W. Snow and Company Warehouse was built in 1913.  It was designed by Russell & King.  It was listed on the National Register of Historic Places in 2007.

It was listed for its Modern Movement architecture.

The building was renovated extensively in recent years.  Windows that had been bricked in were restored, and much more.

References

Commercial buildings on the National Register of Historic Places in New York (state)
Commercial buildings completed in 1913
Warehouses on the National Register of Historic Places
Buildings and structures in Syracuse, New York
1913 establishments in New York (state)
National Register of Historic Places in Syracuse, New York